Aden Group (often referred to as Aden) is an integrated facility management (IFM) and energy-management company based in Shanghai, China. Aden Group is notable for its focus on the integration of technology into its services, including virtual twin; robotics; and technologies for distributed energy and energy optimization. Aden employs approximately 26,000 people worldwide, and has operations in 25 countries. The majority of employees (23,000) are based in Mainland China, where the company has over 1,500 clients. Aden also has a strong presence in Southeast Asia, especially Vietnam and Indonesia, as well as camp operations in Africa, Central Asia and Latin America. Aden's clients cover several sectors, but are especially concentrated in the industrial, commercial, healthcare and governmental sectors.

Joint ventures & consortiums 
Aden Group has several strategic partnerships. Tera Energies – distributed energy and energy optimization. Joint venture with Total-Eran and Eren Groupe.Akila Care – smart & connected modular hospital for long-term deployment in developing world. Consortium with Dassault Systemes, Saint Gobain, Sinopharm, CSCEC Third Bureau and Chengdong Housing ASAP Rental – handling fleet rental and management, AGV. Joint Venture with Aprolis.Rapid SAS – project-based operations for high-security regions

History

Founding and Early Days 
Aden was founded under the name Aden Services in Ho Chi Minh City, Vietnam in 1997 by French entrepreneur Joachim Poylo. Poylo founded the company as a strategically Asia-centric facility management company, feeling that the European and American competitors were overlooking region's potential. In its first year, Aden signed with clients such as Saigon Trade Center and Sofitel. Following two years of growth in Vietnam and entry to the Chinese market, Aden moved its headquarters to China, where it expanded to several other regional offices.

Global expansion 
In the mid-2000s, Aden expanded their services globally to clients in Central Asia, the Middle East, and Africa as the business continued to grow in China. In 2008, the company collaborated with the Chinese Olympic Committee to provide logistics services at the Beijing Summer Olympics and began working with Huawei as a major client. Two years later, Aden partnered with the government to support the 2010 World Expo in Shanghai.

IFM and transformation period 
2015 began period of transformation, as Aden widened the scope of its services from single and multi-service facility management to IFM (integrated facilities management) while also expanding its focus to areas outside of traditional facility management. In 2016, Aden and Aprolis established ASAP Rental as well as acquiring OCS Vietnam, one of the largest IFM companies in the country. In 2018, Aden founded the subsidiary Adenergy, which in 2020 became the joint venture Tera Energies. 
During the COVID-19 crisis of 2020, Aden's focus on the Asian market, as well as its involvement in the medical sector, put it on the frontline of the crisis and gave Aden a key role in the hygiene and sanitization of workspaces, as well as rapid-response projects to ensure delivery of PPE from China to European governments.

References 

 Aden | Technology with a human touch

Property management companies
Companies based in Shanghai